Ricaniidae is a family of planthopper insects, containing over 400 species worldwide. The highest diversity is in tropical Africa and Asia and in Australia, with a few species occurring in the Palearctic and Neotropical realms. It is one of the smaller families in the planthopper superfamily Fulgoroidea.

Subfamilies and Genera
As of 2022, Fulgoromorpha Lists on the Web includes:

Pharsalinae
Auth.: Gnezdilov, 2009 (Neotropical - all presently monotypic)
 Pharsalus Melichar, 1906
 Ricamela Gnezdilov, 2019
 Silvanana Metcalf, 1947

Ricaniinae
Auth.: Amyot & Audinet-Serville, 1843
 Acroprivesa Schmidt, 1912
 Alisca Stål, 1870
 Aliscella Fennah, 1969
 Apachnas Distant, 1909
 Aprivesa Melichar, 1923
 Armacia Stål, 1862
 Armilustrium Distant, 1917
 Carmentalia Distant, 1917
 Coniunctivena Stroinski, Gnezdilov & Bourgoin, 2011
 Cotrades Walker, 1858
 Cyamosa Stroinski, Gnezdilov & Bourgoin, 2011
 Deferundata Distant, 1917
 Deraulax Signoret, 1860
 Epitemna Melichar, 1898
 Epithalamium Kirkaldy, 1906
 Euricania Melichar, 1898
 Globularica Stroinski, Gnezdilov & Bourgoin, 2011
 Hajar Kirkaldy, 1905
 Isobium Melichar, 1906
 Janssensia Lallemand, 1950
 Kazukuru Stroinski, 2021
 Keiserana Synave, 1966
 Kruegeria Schmidt, 1911
 Lambertoniana Dmitriev, 2020
 Lugardia Distant, 1909
 Mahecania Stroinski, 2013
 Marleyia Distant, 1909
 Meliprivesa Metcalf, 1952
 Mesoricania Melichar, 1923
 Motua Distant, 1909
 Motumotua Distant, 1909
 Mulvia Stål, 1866
 Nasatus Stroinski, Gnezdilov & Bourgoin, 2011
 Neoprivesa Distant, 1917
 Nesomimas Fennah, 1971
 Orosanga Fennah, 1971
 Osaka Distant, 1909
 Paici Stroinski, 2010
 Parapiromis Bu, Larivière & Liang, 2010
 Paurostauria Kirby, 1900
 Plestia Stål, 1870
 Pocharica Signoret, 1860
 Pocharista Melichar, 1923
 Pochazia Amyot & Audinet-Serville, 1843
 Pochazina Melichar, 1898
 Pochazoides Signoret, 1860
 Privesa Stål, 1862
 Ricania Germar, 1818  - type genus
 Ricanoides Zia, 1935
 Ricanopsis Melichar, 1898
 Ricanoptera Melichar, 1898
 Ricanula Melichar, 1898
 Scolypopa Stål, 1859
 Scotinax Fennah, 1969
 Semestra Jacobi, 1916
 Sensorica Stroinski, 2021
 Syndetica Bergroth, 1920
 Tarehylava Stroinski, 2021
 Tarundia Stål, 1859
 Trysanor Williams & Fennah, 1980

Ricaniidae incertae sedis
 Jeromicanus Stroinski, 2020
 Five extinct monotypic genera

Gallery

References

 
Auchenorrhyncha families
Fulgoromorpha